Heartbreak is the 14th album by Scottish folk musician Bert Jansch, released in 1982.

Track listing
All tracks composed by Bert Jansch; except where indicated

"Is It Real?"
"Up to the Stars"
"Give Me the Time"
"If I Were a Carpenter" (Tim Hardin)
"Wild Mountain Thyme" (Traditional)
"Heartbreak Hotel" (Mae Boren Axton, Thomas Durden, Elvis Presley)
"Sit Down Beside Me"
"No Rhyme Nor Reason"
"Blackwaterside" (Traditional)
"Not a Word Was Said"

2012 Deluxe Edition

Disc 1

Same as the original LP release, but The limited Lp edition 
has a different song’s order, according to original production this should be the correct one. It really sounds better.

Disc 2 - Live At McCabe's Guitar Shop

"The Curragh Of Kildare"
"Poor Mouth"
"Blackwaterside"
"One For Jo"
"Let Me Sing"
"If I Were a Carpenter"
"Blues Run The Game"
"Is It Real?"
"Ask Your Daddy"
"The First Time Ever I Saw Your Face"
"Kingfisher"
"Wild Mountain Thyme"
"Come Back Baby"
"I Am Lonely"

Personnel
Bert Jansch - guitar, vocals
Albert Lee - guitar, mandolin
Randy Tico - bass
Matt Betton - drums
Jack Kelly - drums
Jennifer Warnes - backing vocals on 5

References

Bert Jansch albums
1982 albums